The Dil Pickle Club or Dill Pickle Club was once a popular Bohemian club in Chicago, Illinois between 1917 and 1935. The Dil Pickle was known as a speakeasy, cabaret and theatre and was influential during the "Chicago Renaissance" as it allowed a forum for free thinkers. It was founded and owned by Wobbly John "Jack" Jones and was frequented by popular American authors, activists and speakers.

The club's legacy has seen several reincarnations, including  Chicago Dil Pickle Club, the Dill Pickle Food Co-op, Dil Pickle Press, and  the Dill Pickle Club of Portland, OR, "an experimental forum for critiquing contemporary culture, politics and humanities."

History
In 1914, John "Jack" Jones, a former organizer for the Wobblies (Industrial Workers of the World (IWW) had started several weekly forums at the Radical Book Shop on North Clark Street in Chicago. The forums discussed labor issues along with social concerns of the day. Soon, in early 1915, Jones needed a new venue as the capacity was exceeded at the forum. To accommodate increased participants, Jones found a decrepit barn on Tooker Alley, off of Dearborn Street in downtown Chicago that he named the Dil Pickle Club. Soon after, fellow labor organizer from Ireland, Jim Larkin joined Jones, along with the "hobo doctor" and anarchist Ben Reitman. Reitman became instrumental in getting regular news coverage of the Pickle in the Chicago Daily News and Chicago Tribune. The news coverage helped increase the club's following and, by 1917, Jones created the Dil Pickle Artisans by officially incorporating it as a non-profit in Illinois to promote arts, crafts, science, and literature.

Jones said of his new club:

During the early years of the Dil Pickle Club, Jones began the Dil Pickle Press which produced material to promote the club. The press printed the Dil Pickler newsletter and The Creative World bulletin, along with Jones' book, Tech-Up. It also printed Arthur Desmond's Lion's Paw, Ragnar Redbeard's Might Is Right and works by Sol Omar and J. Edgar Miller. Much of the literature was crudely designed but easily reproduced. It contained humor and often typos. Admission to the club and refreshment sales helped it survive financially. Jones may have also printed counterfeit out-of-print books in order to make additional money.

The club reached its pinnacle by serving not only as a place for debate and idea-sharing, but also as a host for one-act plays, poetry readings, jazz dances, and opera, along with other acts. The Dil Pickle Players was formed to perform original works by local authors, as well as contemporary playwrights. Jones remained active in the club, building the stage and wiring the lighting, as well as writing, directing, and acting in many productions.

During the Great Depression, the Dil Pickle Club began to decline. By the early 1930s, the club was frequented more by Chicago mobsters than the usual free-minded Bohemian attendees. Soon the club lost its unique taste and personality, as rent rates in Chicago rose. Tax difficulties in 1933 proved the end of the Dil Pickle Club. Despite Jones' efforts to save the club, which included the sale of the wooden Du Dil Duck toy, the Dil Pickle Club closed in 1934. Jones struggled financially thereafter until his death in 1940.

Jack Sheridan, who had been attending the Dil Pickle Club since boyhood, tried to revive the club in 1944 in the Tooker Alley premises, but the building was condemned as unsafe.

Characteristics

The Dil Pickle Club was almost hidden from the outside and was considered a "hole in the wall" in Tooker Alley. The entrance was marked by a "DANGER" sign that which pointed to the orange main door which was lit by a green light. On the door, it read: "Step High, Stoop Low and Leave Your Dignity Outside." Once inside, another sign read "Elevate Your Mind to a Lower Level of Thinking" before you entered the main part of the club. Immediately inside was a large main room with a stage. The room was decorated with brightly painted chairs and partially surrounded by counters where drinks and sandwiches were sold. The rest of the club was also decorated by its attendees and contained a tearoom and art exhibitions. Altogether, the club had reported standing capacity for 700 people.

Popular attendees
The club was frequented by many radical American activists, political speakers and authors. It was accepting of homosexuals. Among the American activists and speakers was Clarence Darrow, Emma Goldman, Big Bill Haywood, Hippolyte Havel, Lucy Parsons, Ben Reitman and Nina Spies. American authors included Pulitzer Prize winner Upton Sinclair along with Sherwood Anderson, Carl Sandburg, Ben Hecht, Vachel Lindsay, Djuna Barnes, William Carlos Williams, Kenneth Rexroth and Vincent Starrett. Other common attendees were poet, writer and Wobbly, Slim Brundage, speaker Martha Biegler, speaker Elizabeth Davis, artist Stanislav Szukalski, Harry Wilson and egoist F. M. Wilkesbarr (aka Malfew Seklew).

A club for people with ideas and questions, it often attracted a mixed crowd. Scientists, panhandlers, prostitutes, socialists, anarchists, con men, tax advocates, religious zealots, social workers and hoboes were commonly at the club. Chicagoan George Wellington "Cap" Streeter was also said to have visited and spoken at the Dil Pickle Club.

Notes
Original Dill Pickle Club address: 10 Tooker Place, Chicago, Illinois

References

External links
Picture of Dil Pickle Club - Chicago Public Radio
 Dill Pickle Club Records at the Newberry Library
 Images from the Dill Pickle Club from the exhibition Outspoken: Chicago's Free Speech Tradition
 Chicago’s Dill Pickle Club: Where Anarchists Mixed With Doctors And Poets - Curious City

1915 establishments in Illinois
Debating societies
Dining clubs
Freethought organizations
Industrial Workers of the World in Illinois
Literary circles
Non-profit corporations
Organizations based in Chicago
Writing circles
Speakeasies
1935 disestablishments in Illinois